Ștefan is the Romanian form of Stephen, used as both a given name and a surname. For the English version, see Stefan.

Some better known people with the name Ștefan are listed below. For a comprehensive list see .

Notable persons with that name include:

People with the given name

People with the surname 
Aurel Ștefan
Iulian Teodor Ștefan

See also 
 Ștefănescu (surname)
 Ștefănești (disambiguation)
 Ștefania (name)
 Ștefan cel Mare (disambiguation)
 Ștefan Vodă, name of several villages in Romania

Surnames
Romanian-language surnames
Romanian masculine given names